"Leap of Faith" is a song written and recorded by American country music singer Lionel Cartwright.  It was released in June 1991 as the first single from his album Chasin' the Sun.  The song became his first and only number #1 country hit in September of that year.

Critical reception
A Miami Herald review of the album said that the song showed Cartwright's more commercial and country pop oriented side, compared to the bluegrass and Cajun influences shown by the rest of the tracks. It was also referred to as a "radio programmer's dream" in the same review.

Music video
The music video was directed by John Lloyd Miller and premiered in mid-1991.

Personnel
As listed in liner notes.
Eddie Bayers – drums
Paul Franklin – steel guitar
Mike Lawler – keyboards
George Marinelli – electric guitar
Don Potter – acoustic guitar
Hershey Reeves – background vocals
Michael Rhodes – bass guitar
Matt Rollings – piano
Harry Stinson – background vocals

Chart performance
"Leap of Faith" was Cartwright's only Number One hit, spending twenty weeks on Billboard Hot Country Singles & Tracks (now Hot Country Songs) and peaking on the chart week of September 21, 1991.

Year-end charts

References

1991 singles
Lionel Cartwright songs
Song recordings produced by Tony Brown (record producer)
Song recordings produced by Barry Beckett
Songs written by Lionel Cartwright
MCA Records singles
Music videos directed by John Lloyd Miller
1991 songs